The Little Ranger is a 1938 Our Gang short comedy film directed by Gordon Douglas.  It was the 169th short in the Our Gang series, and the first produced by Metro-Goldwyn-Mayer, who purchased the rights to the series from creator Hal Roach.

Plot
Snubbed by his girlfriend Darla, Alfalfa accepts the invitation of tomboyish Muggsy to attend the local picture show. While watching the adventures of his favorite cowboy star, Alfalfa dreams that he himself is a Wild West sheriff, with his pals Buckwheat and Porky as deputies. Naturally, Darla also figures prominently in Alfalfa's dream, as does his archrival Butch. What happens next determines Alfalfa's destiny when he wakes up from his dream.

Cast

The Gang
 Carl Switzer as Alfalfa
 Darla Hood as Darla
 Eugene Lee as Porky
 Billie Thomas as Buckwheat
 Shirley Coates as Muggsy

Additional cast
 Tommy Bond as Butch
 Sidney Kibrick as Woim
 Darwood Kaye as Waldo
 Grace Bohanon as Girl in theatre

Members of Butch's gang
Dix Davis, Tim Davis, Calvin Robert Ellison, Joe "Corky" Geil, Henry Lee, Joe Levine, Harold Switzer, Fred Walburn

Notability
The Little Ranger was the first Our Gang entry to be produced at MGM. By 1936, Hal Roach, who had produced the series at his studio since 1922, had wanted to get out of the increasingly less profitable short subjects market and into feature films. While Roach successfully moved Laurel and Hardy into features and began producing several other feature properties such as Topper, the Our Gang feature General Spanky was a box office failure and MGM persuaded Roach to keep the series in production as a series of one-reel shorts.

Roach constantly fought with MGM to get distribution for a larger number of feature film releases as the studio's short subject output was reduced to only the Our Gang one-reelers. In early 1938, United Artists offered Roach a more lucrative and flexible distribution deal, prompting him to end his deal with MGM. This was done by delivering a final Roach-MGM Laurel and Hardy feature, Block-Heads, canceling two "All-Star" musical features Roach was contracted to produce for MGM, and selling the entire Our Gang unit to MGM.

The Our Gang sale was done at MGM's insistence rather than canceling the still-popular and profitable series. The sale included rights to the name "Our Gang", contracts for the child actors and writers, and a provision that forbade Roach to produce any Our Gang-like films or to reissue any Our Gang film he had produced. Then-current Our Gang director Gordon Douglas was loaned out for several months to launch the series at MGM, who would hire George Sidney as the permanent series director.

Hal Roach Studios veterans Hal Law and former part-time director Robert A. McGowan transferred to MGM to write the screenplays for the new Our Gang shorts. McGowan was the nephew of Our Gang's original director and producer Robert F. McGowan, and had directed several mediocre 1920s/early 1930s Our Gang shorts himself under the pseudonym "Anthony Mack".

Production notes
The Little Ranger was filmed late in June 1938, six weeks after Hide and Shriek. In their book The Little Rascals: The Life and Times of Our Gang, film historians Leonard Maltin and Richard W. Bann stated that The Little Ranger was "a fine example of what could have been done with Our Gang at their new headquarters". MGM continued producing the 10-minute Our Gang  shorts until 1944. Many subsequent works are seen as lesser entries in the series canon.

This was also the fourth short of five to be made without George "Spanky" McFarland. McFarland had departed from the series when his contract with Roach ended in February 1938, and would return when rehired by MGM in July. Tommy "Butch" Bond, Darwood "Waldo" Kaye, and Sidney "The Woim" Kibrick returned for this short and would continue with the series until 1940 on a recurring status. The new Our Gang theme song was an instrumental medley of "London Bridge", "Here We Go Round the Mulberry Bush" and "The Farmer in the Dell". It remained in use until the series ended in 1944.

See also
 Our Gang filmography

References

External links
 
 

1938 films
American black-and-white films
1938 comedy films
Films directed by Gordon Douglas
Metro-Goldwyn-Mayer short films
Our Gang films
1938 short films
1930s American films